20/20 Vision is the seventh studio album by American country music artist Ronnie Milsap, released in 1976.

Track listing

Note: The song "You Snap Your Fingers (And I'm Back in Your Hands)" later appeared as a track on his 1989 album Stranger Things Have Happened.

Personnel
Acoustic Guitar: Jimmy Capps, Chip Young
Background Vocals: The Holladay Sisters (tracks 2,5,10), The Jordanaires (tracks 1,3,4,6,7,9), The Nashville Edition (track 8)
Bass guitar: Mike Leech, Henry Strzelecki, Jack Williams
Drums: Hayward Bishop, Larrie Londin, Kenny Malone
Electric Guitar: Glenn Keener, Reggie Young
Fiddle: Jim Buchanan, Marcy Cates, Marjorie Cates, Tommy Williams
Harmonica: Charlie McCoy, Terry McMillan
Lead Vocals: Ronnie Milsap
Percussion: Farrell Morris
Piano: Ronnie Milsap, Bobby Ogdin, Hargus "Pig" Robbins
Steel Guitar: Lloyd Green, John Hughey, Dick Overbey, Hal Rugg
String Arranger: D. Bergen White (tracks 1,3,6,8)
Vibraphone: Charlie McCoy, Farrell Morris

Charts

Singles

References

1976 albums
RCA Records albums
Ronnie Milsap albums